Eresia nauplius, the Peruvian crescent or Nauplius crescent, is a butterfly of the family Nymphalidae. It was described by William Chapman Hewitson in 1852. It is found in most of the Amazon region. The habitat consists of forest edges with low vegetation, including river banks, forest clearings, glades and roadsides.

The wingspan is about 45 mm. Adults feed on flower nectar and males have been observed imbibing moisture from sandbanks, river beds, drying pools or peccary wallows.

Subspecies
Eresia nauplius nauplius (Guyanas, Brazil: Amazonas)
Eresia nauplius extensa (Hall, 1929) (Brazil: Mato Grosso, lower Rio Madeira)
Eresia nauplius plagiata (Röber, 1913) (Brazil, Colombia, Peru, Ecuador)

References

 Eresia nauplius at MCZBASE: The Database of the Zoological Collections

Butterflies described in 1852
Melitaeini
Fauna of Brazil
Nymphalidae of South America
Taxa named by Carl Linnaeus